Netalzul Meadows Provincial Park is a provincial park in British Columbia, Canada. It is located in the Harold-Price watershed, about 50 km north of Smithers. The park consists of an unusual wet meadow complex, as well as a spectacular waterfall and rare plant species.

External links

BC Parks: Netalzul Meadows Provincial Park

Bulkley Valley
Provincial parks of British Columbia
Protected areas established in 1999
1999 establishments in British Columbia
Meadows in Canada